David Rick Paterson (born February 10, 1958 in Kingston, Ontario) is a retired professional ice hockey player who played 430 games in the National Hockey League.  He played with the Chicago Black Hawks from 1978 through 1987. After leaving Chicago, he worked as Assistant Coach with the Pittsburgh Penguins from 1988 through 1993, winning two Stanley Cups in 1991 and 1992. He was named interim coach for the Tampa Bay Lightning in 1997. The team went 0–8–0 under Paterson. He was later named chief professional scout for the Tampa Bay Lightning before their 2002–2003 season and won a Stanley Cup with that club in 2004. He currently works as the director of player personnel for the Anaheim Ducks, who won the Stanley Cup in 2007.

External links 

1958 births
Living people
Anaheim Ducks executives
Anaheim Ducks scouts
Canadian ice hockey right wingers
Chicago Blackhawks draft picks
Chicago Blackhawks players
Ice hockey people from Ontario
Sportspeople from Kingston, Ontario
Pittsburgh Penguins coaches
Stanley Cup champions
Tampa Bay Lightning coaches
Tampa Bay Lightning scouts
Canadian ice hockey coaches